Spore is an action puzzle game for the Commodore 64, Commodore 16, and ZX Spectrum, released by Mastertronic in 1987. Its title screen credits Jim Baguley with writing it, although Paul Rogers claims to have written it and its unreleased sequel, Mutant Zone. The music was composed by David Whittaker.

The game includes a level editor for users to create their own maps.

Reception

Zzap!64 gave the Commodore 64 version 97% and a silver medal; Crash gave the ZX Spectrum version 67%.

References

External links

1987 video games
Commodore 16 and Plus/4 games
Commodore 64 games
Maze games
ZX Spectrum games
Video games scored by David Whittaker
Video games developed in the United Kingdom
Video games with user-generated gameplay content
Mastertronic games